Daniel James Zamora (born April 15, 1993) is an American professional baseball pitcher in the Pittsburgh Pirates organization. Zamora played college baseball for the Stony Brook Seawolves and was drafted by the Pittsburgh Pirates in the 40th round of the 2015 draft. He has played in Major League Baseball (MLB) for the New York Mets, with whom he made his debut in 2018 and for the Seattle Mariners.

Amateur career
Zamora attended Bishop Amat High School in La Puente, California. Zamora was selected in the 27th round by the Toronto Blue Jays in the 2012 MLB draft, but did not sign. Instead, he enrolled at Stony Brook University, where he played college baseball for the Stony Brook Seawolves.

Zamora struggled in his freshman year in college, making 14 starts and posting a 5.11 ERA in 75.2 innings. He redshirted his 2014 sophomore season after tearing his labrum and missing the entire year. Making his return a redshirt sophomore in 2015, Zamora was deemed the 'ace' of the Stony Brook rotation, making 13 starts and putting up a 3.00 ERA while striking out 80 in 81 innings. Zamora was named to the America East All-Conference First Team, leading the conference in strikeouts and helping Stony Brook win the conference championship and reach the NCAA Tournament. In 2013, he played collegiate summer baseball in the Cape Cod Baseball League for the Orleans Firebirds, and returned to the league in 2015 to play for the Yarmouth-Dennis Red Sox.

Professional career

Pittsburgh Pirates
The Pittsburgh Pirates selected Zamora in the 40th round of the 2015 MLB draft. He played for the Bradenton Marauders of the Class A-Advanced Florida State League in 2017, and was named an All-Star. He also played briefly for the Altoona Curve of the Class AA Eastern League.

New York Mets
The Pirates traded Zamora to the New York Mets for Josh Smoker in January 2018. He began the 2018 season with the Binghamton Rumble Ponies of the Eastern League. The Mets promoted him to the major leagues on August 17. He made his debut that night. He was the first player drafted in the 40th round to make the majors since the draft was shortened to 40 rounds. In his rookie season, Zamora appeared in 16 games, pitching nine innings and striking out 16 with a 3.00 ERA. In 2019 for the Mets, Zamora appeared in 17 games, registering a 5.19 ERA with 8 strikeouts in 8.2 innings of work. He did not appear in a game in the pandemic shortened 2020 season. He was assigned to the Triple-A Syracuse Mets to begin the 2021 season. On May 21, 2021, Zamora was designated for assignment by the Mets.

Seattle Mariners
On May 22, 2021, Zamora was claimed off waivers by the Seattle Mariners. Zamora split time between the Triple-A Tacoma Rainiers and Seattle, but was designated for assignment on June 24 after struggling to a 6.23 ERA in 4 major league appearances.
The next day, Zamora cleared waivers and was sent outright to Triple-A Tacoma.

Toros de Tijuana
On February 21, 2022, Zamora signed with the Toros de Tijuana of the Mexican League.

Los Angeles Dodgers
On March 10, 2022, Zamora signed a minor league deal with the Los Angeles Dodgers. He spent the season with their Triple-A franchise in Oklahoma City, pitching in 51 games with a 4–2 record and 3.86 ERA. He elected free agency on November 10, 2022.

Pittsburgh Pirates
On December 22, 2022, Zamora signed a minor league deal with the Pittsburgh Pirates.

References

External links

1993 births
Living people
People from Loma Linda, California
Baseball players from California
Major League Baseball pitchers
New York Mets players
Seattle Mariners players
Stony Brook Seawolves baseball players
Orleans Firebirds players
Yarmouth–Dennis Red Sox players
West Virginia Black Bears players
West Virginia Power players
Bradenton Marauders players
Altoona Curve players
Binghamton Rumble Ponies players
Syracuse Mets players
Tacoma Rainiers players
Toros del Este players
American expatriate baseball players in the Dominican Republic
Oklahoma City Dodgers players